1939 Soviet Top League was the fifth season of the Soviet Top League known at that time as Group A.

It started on May 12 with six games of the first round. The main calendar was scheduled to be finished on October 19 with the Moscow derby between Lokomotiv and Dynamo. However, due to numerous protests and postponed games the championship finished on November 30 in Tbilisi with game between Dynamo Tbilisi and Dynamo Odessa. The new champions became Spartak Moscow with two teams being relegated: Elektrik Leningrad and Dynamo Odessa. This was the first full season championship with each team playing over 25 games.

The last year defending champions were Spartak Moscow. There were no newly promoted teams and initially was decided to conduct the championship with 12 teams. However the Soviet sport committee allowed for two Leningrad teams Stalinets and Elektrik to remain in the league.

Spartak once again won the cup competition that started in summer with final played in mid-September. That was the last edition of the cup before World War II.

Representation by republic

  10
  3
  1

Standings

Results

Top scorers
21 goals
 Grigory Fedotov (CDKA Moscow)

19 goals
 Boris Paichadze (Dinamo Tbilisi)

18 goals
 Sergei Kapelkin (CDKA Moscow)
 Viktor Semyonov (Spartak Moscow)

16 goals
 Ivan Mitronov (Metallurg Moscow)

15 goals
 Viktor Shilovsky (Dynamo Kiev)

14 goals
 Mikhail Semichastny (Dynamo Moscow)

13 goals
 Aleksandr Nazarov (Dynamo Moscow)
 Aleksei Zaytsev (Metallurg Moscow)
 Georgi Zharkov (Torpedo Moscow)

References

 Soviet Union - List of final tables (RSSSF)

Soviet Top League seasons
1
Soviet
Soviet